Cyprus sent one athlete to the 1978 European Athletics Championships which took place 29 August–3 September 1978 in Prague. Cyprus won no medals at the Championships.

References 

Nations at the 1978 European Athletics Championships
1978
1978 in Cypriot sport